Murali Krishnudu   is a 1988 Telugu-language drama film produced by S. Gopal Reddy under the Bhargav Art Productions banner and directed by Kodi Ramakrishna. It stars Nagarjuna, Rajani and music composed by K. V. Mahadevan.

Plot
Murali Krishna, a multimillionaire, is an easy going guy who spends most of his time with girlfriends. Krishnaveni is a middle-class girl who lives with her widowed mother. She works as a dance teacher in a drama company for a living. One day, Murali Krishna's car driver helps her by dropping Krishnaveni to her office. Everyone in the drama company misinterprets her as Murali Krishna's girlfriend. The drama company owner encourages her by providing additional benefits, in view getting off a possible lucrative donation and other benefits from Murali Krishna. Krishnaveni thinks of this as an innocent prank that may fetch her better work and decides to play out the charade as Murali's girlfriend. Once they send their company bills to Murali Krishna's company; as soon as Murali knows of this matter, he decides to confront Krishnaveni, but falls in love with her at first sight. Thus, he introduces himself as a bill collector of Murali Krishna's company. Eventually, both of them hang around together and gradually develop a liking towards each other. After some time, he reveals the truth and expresses his love towards her and she also accepts it. But suddenly a cruel person Parasuram (Mohan Babu) enters into their life, claiming to be Krishnaveni's husband. The remaining story is; What was the relation between Parasuram and Krishnaveni? What happens to the love story of Murali Krishna and Krishnaveni?

Cast

Nagarjuna as Murali Krishna
Rajani as Krishnaveni
Mohan Babu as Parasuram
Gollapudi Maruti Rao as Murali Krishna's grandfather
Sowcar Janaki as Murali Krishna's grandmother
Raavi Kondala Rao as Drama company Owner
Gokina Rama Rao as Krishnaveni's father
Chidatala Appa Rao 
Chitti Babu as Driver 
K. K. Sarma as Manager
Juttu Narasimham 
Dham 
Kueli as Item Number
Chandrika as Parimala
Anitha as Krishnaveni's mother
Y.Vijaya as Kanyakumari

Soundtrack

Music composed by K. V. Mahadevan. Lyrics was written by C. Narayana Reddy and Vennelakanti. Music released on SAPTASWAR Audio Company.

References

External links

Films directed by Kodi Ramakrishna
Films scored by K. V. Mahadevan